The NME XB V8 is a four-stroke, naturally-aspirated, V8 racing engine, designed, developed, and build by British manufacturer Nicholson McLaren, for a variety of different applications and motor racing events, including sports car racing, open-wheel racing, hillclimb events, and time trial events. It has been manufactured since 2003, and is based on the Ford-Cosworth XB Champ Car engine, albeit slightly enlarged, and minus the turbocharger. It was the sole engine used in the short-lived Grand Prix Masters series, and has also been used in various LMP2 cars.

References

V8 engines